Gamma-glutamyltransferase 5 is an enzyme that in humans is encoded by the GGT5 gene.

Gamma-glutamyltransferase-like activity 1 (GGTLA1) is a member of a gene family with at least 4 members (GGTLA1, GGTLA2, GGTLA3 and GGTLA4). The enzyme encoded by GGTLA1 is related to, but distinct from, gamma-glutamyl transpeptidase (GGT). The GGTLA1 enzyme consists of a heavy and a light chain and is able to hydrolyze the gamma-glutamyl moiety of glutathione. It converts leukotriene C4 to leukotriene D4, however, it doesn't convert synthetic substrates that are commonly used to assay GGT. Its amino acid sequence shows an overall similarity of 39.5% with human GGT.

References

Further reading